Glochidion puberum is a species of shrub or small tree in the family Phyllanthaceae. It is native to China, where it is widely distributed in both subtropical and temperate regions (Anhui, Fujian, Gansu, Guangdong, Guizhou, Hainan, Henan, Hubei, Hunan, Jiangsu, Jiangxi, Shaanxi, Sichuan, Yunnan, and Zhejiang provinces and Tibet and Guangxi autonomous regions). It has also been reported from Taiwan and Japan, and is morphologically very similar to the species Glochidion chodoense, endemic to southern South Korea. In Mandarin it is known as 算盘子 (suanpanzi), which also refers to the genus Glochidion as a whole. In China it is used for medicinal purposes.

This species has become naturalized at several locations in Alabama in the United States.

References

puberum
Flora of China